"Pictures in the Fire" is a song by Pat Boone that reached number 77 on the Bllboard Hot 100 in 1962.

Track listing

Charts

References 

1962 songs
1962 singles
Pat Boone songs
Dot Records singles